The Massacre of Svobodny was a series of events that occurred in the town of Svobodny, Russia (now in the Amur Oblast region of Russia) in 1921, the Svobodny Uprising, the Free City Disaster, and the Svobodny Pogrom. The uprising was a protest against the policies of the Soviet government, and it was led by a group of anti-communist rebels who were known as the White Guards. The Korean guerrillas also rose against the Far Eastern Republic and refused to accept the Red Army's command, but they were ultimately defeated. Both sides committed atrocities against the civilian population, even the Jewish settlement was burned, and the White Guards massacred the Jews.

Background
In 1920, mass Anti-Japanese uprisings took place, distinguished by exceptional cruelty on both the Bolsheviks and the White movement. By the end of the autumn, the Japanese had pulled two divisions into the rebellious region, whose punitive campaign turned into genocide. In the face of the inevitable defeat, the Korean partisans began to retreat along the Russian border to the north and cross it in the Iman area, beyond which the territories of the Bolsheviks formed. Others have reached Amur altogether. The All-Korean National Council was establishing relations with the communists in Blagoveshchensk, and a battalion of Communist Koreans led by Commander Oh Hamuk was already standing in Svobodny.

Events

Svobodny Uprising
The uprising began on January 13, 1921, when a group of White Guard rebels attacked the local Soviet government and military forces. The rebels took control of the town and declared the independence of the "Svobodny Republic." The Soviet government responded by sending in troops to suppress the rebellion, and on January 22, the town was retaken by the Soviets. During the fighting, both sides committed atrocities against the civilian population. It is estimated that between 600 and 1,000 people were killed, including civilians and combatants. The massacre became a rallying cry for anti-communist forces and was used as propaganda by the White Guard rebels.

Free City Disaster
On March 15, 1921, an All-Korean Partisan Congress was held in the village of Krasnoyarovo on the Zee, following which Korean detachments from all over the Far East began to gather here. The place of their deployment was Svobodny, Krasnoyarovo, and Mazanovo; the number reached 6,000 fighters, and for reasons of conspiracy, they called all this the Sakhalin partisan detachment. In parallel, the Korean Military Revolutionary Council was established, which the communists decided to form in Irkutsk. The Koreans were led by the Georgian anarcho-communist Nestor Kalandarishvili, who had a tremendous experience of guerrilla warfare in Siberia. That's where the problem began: most Koreans hoped to organize a liberation campaign against Seoul with the support of Soviet Russia. Soviet Russia, on the other hand, conducted the most complicated diplomatic bargaining with Japan for the occupied territories. An attack by Korean partisans would have given Japan a first-class casus belli. Therefore, the Koreans gathered in Svobodny to partially disarm them and integrate them into the Red Army.

The Koreans split into the "Shanghai" (Sakhalin) and "Irkutsk" parties; the situation was steadily heating up, and now the commanders of the Sakhalin detachment sent a letter to Kalandarishvili. The commanders threatened to withdraw from subordination and commit suicide. The next step was an attempt at an unauthorized march to the east, but it was also demonstrative; after reaching the Khingan Mountains, the Sakhalin detachment returned to Surazhevka. On June 28, 1921, the Free City Disaster began, an attempt to disarm the partisans on the orders of Kalandarishvili turned into street battles, in which hundreds of people were killed, and the wooden city burned down. The Korean guerrillas were defeated, and in the aftermath of the conflict, the "Shanghainese" lost more than 600 people killed, 917 were captured, and some of the prisoners were executed after the battle. In total, 30,000 Koreans were killed.

Svobodny Pogrom
In the summer of 1921, the local Bolshevik authorities and General Yevgeny Miller of the White Russian forces used the Free City Disaster to massacre the town's Jewish population. 

At that time, the Soviet government faced a wave of anti-Semitism, and local officials in Svobodny blamed the Jewish people for various problems, including food shortages and economic difficulties. The local authorities organized a pogrom, in which a mob of residents attacked and killed dozens of Jews.

The Massacre of Svobodny was one of several pogroms in the Russian Empire and Soviet Union in the early 20th century. During the pogrom, an estimated 3,000 to 6,000 Jews were slaughtered, and around 500 Jewish homes and businesses were looted and destroyed. The Soviet government did not take decisive action to prevent or punish the perpetrators of the pogroms, and many Jews fled the area in the aftermath of the violence.

Aftermath
On 22 November 1922, the Soviet Union annexed the Far Eastern Republic, claiming all the populace there as their citizens, including Koreans residing there. With the newly established Soviet rule, circumstances began to change. In order to discourage further immigration, 700 to 800 Koreans were deported from Okhotsk to the Empire of Japan in 1925. That same year, a proposed Korean ASSR, which would give Koreans autonomy, was rejected by Soviet officials. The 1926 Soviet Census enumerated 169,000 Koreans, 77,000 Chinese and 1,000 Japanese in the Far East Region. During the collectivization and the Dekulakization campaigns in the 1930s, more Koreans were deported from the Soviet Far East.

Due to lingering sentiments from the Russo-Japanese War and contemporary disdain for imperialist Japan, Soviet officials increased its suspicion and mania towards the Soviet Koreans, fearing they could remain loyal subjects of the Empire and be used by Japan for espionage or "counter-revolutionary propaganda". They also feared that an increasing presence of Koreans in the U.S.S.R. could be used by Japan to justify expansion of the boundaries of Korea.

Between 1928 and 1932, anti-Korean and anti-Chinese violence increased in the Soviet Far East, causing 50,000 Korean emigrants to flee to Manchuria and Korea. On 13 April 1928, a Soviet decree was passed stipulating that Koreans should be removed away from the vulnerable Soviet-Korean border, from Vladivostok to the Khabarovsk Oblast, and to settle Slavs in their place, mostly demobilized Red Army soldiers. An official plan intended to resettle 88,000 Koreans without citizenship north of Khabarovsk, except those who "proved their complete loyalty and devotion to Soviet power".

The Soviet government later condemned Anti-Semitism and implemented policies to promote the rights of Jewish citizens and combat anti-Semitism.

Legacy
There are multiple reasons why the massacre is relatively unknown. First, the event itself was overshadowed by the larger, more well-known Russian Civil War, a conflict between different factions vying for control of the newly formed Soviet Union. Also, the massacre occurred in an isolated region of the country, far from the major cities and centers of power. Furthermore, the story of the killings was suppressed for many years by the Soviet government, which did not want to acknowledge or discuss the event. Finally, the massacre was largely forgotten by the West, as it was overshadowed by other events of the time, such as World War I and the Russian Revolution.

See also
Military History of Korea
Korean Independence Movement
Provisional Government of the Republic of Korea
Deportation of Koreans in the Soviet Union
Russian Civil War
Pogroms of the Russian Civil War
Pogroms

References

Sources

Bibliography
 Kim, Y. (2019). Andante Cantabile. Retrieved from https://doi.org/10.14418/wes01.1.2099

Russian Civil War
History of Siberia
White movement
Military history of the Arctic
 
20th century in Korea
Military history of Korea
Massacres in Russia
Anti-Jewish pogroms of the Russian Civil War
Massacres committed by the Soviet Union
Anti-Korean sentiment
Mass murder in 1921
Conflicts in 1921